Paula Maria Luethen is an Australian politician. She was a Liberal member of the South Australian House of Assembly from the 2018 state election, representing King, until she lost it at the 2022 state election.

Luethen was a City of Tea Tree Gully councillor before her election to state parliament.

During her maiden speech in parliament, she spoke of domestic violence and being a victim of child sexual abuse in her past.

References

Members of the South Australian House of Assembly
Year of birth missing (living people)
Living people
Liberal Party of Australia members of the Parliament of South Australia
Women members of the South Australian House of Assembly
21st-century Australian politicians
21st-century Australian women politicians